Aebi is a surname. It is a Swiss German pet name for the personal name Adalbert (Albert).
People with the surname include:

 Andreas Aebi (born 1958), Swiss politician 
 Beat Aebi (born 1966), Swiss former football player
 Ermanno Aebi (1892–1976), Italian-Swiss football player
 Giorgio Aebi (1923–2005), Italian football player
 Irene Aebi (born  1939), Swiss musician
 Magdalena Aebi (1898–1980), Swiss philosopher
 Max Aebi (born 1948), Swiss-Canadian physician
 Ormond Aebi (1916–2004), American bee-keeper
 Regula Aebi (born 1965), Swiss sprinter
 Tania Aebi (born 1966), Swiss-American sailor
 Ueli Aebi, Swiss biologist

See also 
 Aeby (similar name)

References 

Swiss-German surnames